The Washington State Board of Education (SBE) is the overseeing body of education in the U.S. State of Washington

Membership 
The 16 members of the State Board of Education include those selected by the Governor of Washington, those elected by local school districts, a private school representative, and two student representatives. The students are advisory voting members selected by the Washington Association of Student Leaders.

References

External links
State Board of Education

State Board of Education
Board of Education
Washington